Nao Watanabe (渡邊奈央) is a Japanese singer signed with Domo Records.

Life
Nao Watanabe's musical influence was provided by her mother, who loves music.  Watanabe began taking classical piano lessons when she was five and began giving live performances when she was 18 years old.

Her song "Invoice" reached the top 10 in the Independent Chart of a cable broadcasting in Japan.

Influences
Watanabe's met her favorite musician, Kitaro, when she was performing at the live house in Tokyo.  Later, she was offered a contract with Domo Records.

In 2005, she recorded her new album in Los Angeles.

Discography
International album
 Nao Watanabe

Japanese album
 SACHI

External links 
Nao Watanabe: Official web site (Japanese)
Nao Watanabe Official MySpace (Japanese)
Domo Music Group - Nao Watanabe's Record Company

Japanese women pop singers
Living people
21st-century pianists
21st-century Japanese women musicians
Year of birth missing (living people)
Domo Records artists
21st-century women pianists